USRC James Guthrie  was a Revenue Cutter used as a harbor vessel at Baltimore, Maryland. Originally the merchant tug George W. Loane it was purchased in 1868 for $16,500 and was named for James Guthrie, twenty first Secretary of the Treasury. Her duties were customs inspections and vessel movement in Baltimore harbor. She was decommissioned and sold in April 1882 for $4031.

References

U.S. Coast Guard and Revenue Cutters, 1790-1935, Donald L. Canney, Naval Institute Press, 1995

Ships of the United States Revenue Cutter Service